Maksim Anatolyevich Zhavnerchik (born 9 February 1985) is a Belarusian former football defender.

Career
Zhavnerchik received his first call-up to the national side for the friendly match against Kazakhstan, which was held on 9 February 2011, but remained an unused substitute for the game. On 29 March 2011, Zhavnerchik made his debut for the team, playing the first half in a friendly against Canada.

In January 2015, six-years after leaving BATE Borisov for Kuban Krasnodar, Zhavnerchik re-signed for BATE Borisov.

Honours
BATE Borisov
Belarusian Premier League champion: 2006, 2007, 2008, 2015, 2016, 2017
Belarusian Cup winner: 2005–06, 2014–15
Belarusian Super Cup winner: 2015, 2016, 2017

References

External links
 
 Player profile on official BATE website

1985 births
Living people
People from Salihorsk
Belarusian footballers
Association football defenders
Belarus international footballers
Belarusian expatriate footballers
Expatriate footballers in Russia
Russian Premier League players
FC Shakhtyor Soligorsk players
FC BATE Borisov players
FC Kuban Krasnodar players
FC Dinamo Minsk players
Sportspeople from Minsk Region